The Newfoundland Rugby Union is the provincial administrative body for rugby union in Newfoundland and Labrador, Canada. 

Rugby
Rugby union governing bodies in Canada